Spee is the family name of:

 Bibian Mentel (née Spee, 1972–2021), Dutch snowboarder
 Friedrich Spee (Friedrich Spee von Langenfeld) (1591–1635), German Jesuit and author of Cautio Criminalis
 Gitte Spee (born 1950), Dutch children's books illustrator
 Just Spee (born 1965), President of the dutch football association (KNVB)
 Maximilian von Spee (1861–1914), German admiral in the Imperial German Navy
 Nzante Spee (1953–2005), Cameroonian painter

It may also refer to:

 German cruiser Admiral Graf Spee, scuttled outside the port of Montevideo in 1939
 Spee Club, a coed final club at Harvard University
 Spermidine synthase, an enzyme

Dutch-language surnames
German-language surnames